Dorsey is an unincorporated community in Holt County, Nebraska, United States.

History
A post office was established at Dorsey in the 1880s. It was named for George Washington Emery Dorsey, a Representative to the United States Congress from Nebraska.

References

Unincorporated communities in Holt County, Nebraska
Unincorporated communities in Nebraska